The year 1982 in archaeology involved some significant events.

Events
Archaeological Museum of Olympia opens in Greece.
Eindhoven Museum founded as an archaeological open-air museum in the Netherlands.

Excavations
 October 11 - Hull of Tudor navy ship Mary Rose raised from the Solent.
 The Chaco Project ends at Chaco Canyon (begun 1971).

Finds
May 12 - Coppergate Helmet found in York, England.
NASA's Thermal Infrared Multispectral Scanner (TIMS)  detects over 200 miles of a precolumbian (AD 900 or 1000) road system in Chaco Canyon, as well as walls, buildings, and agricultural fields.
Uluburun shipwreck discovered.
Wreck of HMS Swift (1762) located in Puerto Deseado in Patagonia.

Publications
 A. F. Harding (ed.) - Climatic Change in Later Prehistory 
 Richard Hodges - Dark Age Economics: the Origins of Towns and Trade, A.D. 600-1000  
 Roger Moorey - A Century of Biblical Archaeology

Births

Deaths
 September 18 - Pei Wenzhong, founding father of Chinese anthropology, buried at Peking Man Site in Zhoukoudian, China (b. 1904).
 October - Michael J. O'Kelly, Irish archaeologist (b. 1915).

References

Archaeology
Archaeology
Archaeology by year